Reiko Fueting (born 1970 in Königs Wusterhausen) is a German composer living in the United States.

Life and career 
Reiko Fueting was born in 1970 in Königs Wusterhausen, just outside of Berlin in the former East Germany. He studied composition and piano at the Academy of Music Carl Maria von Weber in Dresden before moving  the United States to pursue graduate degrees at Rice University and Manhattan School of Music. Fueting's primary teachers include Jörg Herchet and Nils Vigeland (composition) and Winfried Apel (piano).

Fueting has been a faculty member at Manhattan School of Music since 2000. He teaches composition and has served as chair of the music theory division since 2005. In 2015, New Focus Recordings released names, erased, a full-length album of Fueting's music.

Compositions

Solo 

 names, erased (2014) for cello solo
 wand-uhr - infinite shadows (2013) for guitar solo
 Echo des Lichts (2012) for organ solo
 tanz, tanz (2010) for violin solo
 land - haus - berg (2009) for piano solo
 red wall (2006) for guitar solo
 re-fraction: shadows (2005) for cello solo
 nach-klang: dissolve (2004) for piano solo
 leaving without (2003) for piano solo
 gleichzeitg nacheinander (2001) for piano solo

Chamber 

 leaving without/palimpsest 3 (2014) for clarinet, violin and piano
 ist - Mensch - geworten (2014) for flute and piano
 infinite spring (2009) for guitar, flute, clarinet, viola, and cello
 Kaddish: The Art of Losing (2008) for cello and piano
 leaving without/palimpsest (2006) for piano and clarinet
 re-fraction:shadows/palimpsest 2 (2005) for violin and cello
 nach-klang:dissolve/palimpsest (2004) for flute, bassoon, and piano
 finden - suchen (2002) for alto flute, cello and piano
 light, asleep (2002) for violin and piano
 Es geht ein' dunkle Wolk' herein (1997) for flute and guitar
 Wenn nichts mehr da wäre, wohen man zu gehen hätte, ist das Wiederkommen von Heil (1994) for viola and piano

Ensemble 

 Weg der Schwäne (2015)
 vine: snow (2014)
 leaving without/palimpsest 2 (2007)
 nach-klang:dissolve/palimpsest 2 (2007)

Orchestra 

 stimmen, nachtdurchwaschen (2007)

Vocal 

 mo"nu"ment for C (2015) for baritone, trumpet, trombone, bass clarinet, and string orchestra
 land of silence: waves - bridges (2010) baritone, trumpet, trombone, and bass clarinet
 über zwischen-welten (2006) for baritone, piano, and percussion quartet
 ...gesammeltes Schweigen (2006) for mezzo-soprano solo or with piano
 ...und Ich bin Dein Spiegel (2000) for soprano and string quartet
 ...erst im ershcrockenen Raum (1999) for mezzo-soprano and orchestra
 ...einst wuschen am Grund (1999) for baritone and piano
 ...weil sie in den Gedichten steht (1994) for baritone and cello

Choral 

 in allem frieden (2012)
 ...wie wer klar werden (2012)
 alls ein licht (2011)
 höhen - stufen (2011)
 in allen landen (2010)
 der töne licht (2008)
 ...und wo Du bist (2007)
 ...als aus nacht kimmer wurde (2005)
 weht - umweht (2005)
 atme - erken (2004)
 silently wanders (1999)

Notable Students 
Alex Burtzos
Christopher Cerrone
 Michael Harrison

References 

1970 births
German composers
German male composers
German music theorists
Living people
People from Königs Wusterhausen
Rice University alumni
Manhattan School of Music alumni
Manhattan School of Music faculty